Erik "Eero" Nikolai Järnefelt (8 November 1863 – 15 November 1937) was a Finnish painter and art professor. He is best known for his portraits and landscapes of the area around Koli National Park. He was a medal winner at the Paris Exposition Universelle of 1889 and 1900, and he taught art at the University of Helsinki and was chairman of the Finnish Academy of Fine Arts.

Biography
He was the son of General Alexander Järnefelt and Baroness Elisabeth Järnefelt (née Clodt von Jürgensburg). He came from a Swedish-speaking Finnophile family of artists, writers and composers descended from the Baltic aristocracy. Several of his eight siblings also became well-known:  (a literary critic), Arvid (a judge and writer), Armas (a composer and conductor) and Aino (wife of Jean Sibelius).

After graduating from a private academy, he studied at the Academy of Fine Arts, Helsinki from 1874 to 1878, the Imperial Academy of Arts from 1883 to 1886 (where one of his teachers was his uncle, Mikhail Clodt), and the Académie Julian in Paris from 1886 to 1888, where he studied with Tony Robert-Fleury. A major influence was the Naturalism of Jules Bastien-Lepage.

In 1889, he married the actress . In 1892, he made his first trip to the area around Koli with Juhani Aho and his wife, the painter Venny Soldan-Brofeldt. He was impressed with the scenery there and would continue to visit regularly until 1936. Later, he made several study trips; to Italy in 1894 and Crimea in 1899. That same year, he helped organize an international exhibition in Saint Petersburg, sponsored by Mir Iskusstva.

In 1901, he built a home that he named "Suviranta" (Summer Beach) at the artists' colony near Lake Tuusula, designed by Usko Nyström. He lived there only until 1917, when he moved to Helsinki, but it is still owned and used by his family.

From 1902 to 1928, he taught drawing at the University of Helsinki. He was appointed professor there in 1912 and served as chairman of the "Finnish Academy of Fine Arts". His last major work was an altarpiece for the church in Raahe, completed in 1926. A major retrospective was held in 2013, which included several previously unknown works.

Selected paintings

See also
 Golden Age of Finnish Art
 Finnish art

Notes

References

Further reading 
 Pontus Grate and Nils Göran Hökby, ed. 1880-tal i nordiskt måleri [The 1880s in Nordic painting] (exh. cat., Stockholm: Nationalmuseum, 1985) 
Leena Lindqvist (ed.), Taiteilijan tiellä – Eero Järnefelt 1863–1937 (The Artist's Path), Otava, 2002 
 Marko Toppi (ed.), Eero ja Saimi Järnefeltin kirjeenvaihtoa ja päiväkirjamerkintöjä 1889–1914 (correspondence and diaries, vol.1), SKS, 2009 
 Marko Toppi (ed.), Vain tosi on pysyväistä. Eero ja Saimi Järnefeltin kirjeenvaihtoa ja päiväkirjamerkintöjä 1915–1944 (correspondence and diaries, vol.2), SKS, 2013 .
Kirk Varnedoe, ed. Northern Light: Realism and Symbolism in Scandinavian Painting, 1880–1910 (exh. cat., New York, Brooklyn Museum of Art, 1982) ISBN  
Ludwig Wennervirta: Eero Järnefelt, ja hänen aikansa 1863–1937 (Helsinki: Otava, 1950)

External links 

 Arcadja Auctions: More works by Järnefelt
 Finnish 10 Euro Coin (2013) honoring Eero Järnefelt @ the Mint of Finland
Europeana blog, from January 2020

1863 births
1937 deaths
Artists from Vyborg
People from Viipuri Province (Grand Duchy of Finland)
Finnish people of German descent
19th-century Finnish nobility
Finnish realist painters
19th-century Finnish painters
20th-century Finnish painters